The Eva Perón Foundation was a charitable foundation begun by Eva Perón, a prominent Argentine political leader, when she was the First Lady and Spiritual Leader of the Nation of Argentina. It operated from 1948 to 1955.

Inspiration and Beginnings 

Social welfare in Argentina was highly underdeveloped before Juan Perón was elected President in 1946 and his wife, who had been born into the working classes, was aware of this. Most charity work was undertaken by the Sociedad de Beneficencia, which was controlled by eighty-seven elderly women of the upper classes. The orphans whose care the Sociedad controlled had to wear blue smocks and have their heads shaved; at Christmas they were put out onto the streets of Buenos Aires with collecting tins. Their policies are supposed to have been the inspiration behind Evita's famous declaration that, 'When the rich think about the poor, they have poor ideas.'

The chairpersons of this society were traditionally the Papal Nuncio to Argentina and the First Lady, but the society refused to extend the invitation to Evita when her husband was elected president. At first they insisted that it was because she was too young; but it was widely interpreted as an insult to the new First Lady. Evita was furious and moved against the society, effectively bringing it to an end in 1947. She then created her own foundation to replace it. ‘It is time,’ Evita declared, ‘for [real] social justice.’

The Foundation's Beginnings 

On 8 July 1948 the María Eva Duarte de Perón Foundation was established. Its name was later changed to the simpler Eva Perón Foundation. Its opening charter declared that it was to remain ‘in the sole hands of its founder… who will… possess the widest powers afforded by the State and the Constitution.’  The Foundation's aims were to provide monetary assistance and scholarships to gifted children from impoverished backgrounds, build homes, schools, hospitals and orphanages in underprivileged areas and ‘to contribute or collaborate by any possible means to the creation of works tending to satisfy the basic needs for better life of the less privileged classes.’ Initially work began with nothing more than garden parties for single mothers or Evita’s personal trips to the ghettoes of Buenos Aires to hand out aid parcels.

The Foundation at its height 

By the end of the 1940s, Evita and her team of advisers had worked so effectively that the Foundation was better-funded and organised than many departments of State. It had funds of over three billion pesos, controlled $200 million on the exchange rate, employed over 14,000 workers, purchased 500,000 sewing machines, 400,000 pairs of shoes and 200,000 cooking pots for distribution annually and it had succeeded in building numerous new houses, schools, hospitals and orphanages.

The vast majority of these funds came from willing donors and the Peronist-dominated Congress, who were keen to back the First Lady's endeavours. The trade unions, who saw Evita as their patron, regularly sent enormous contributions to the Foundation’s work. More importantly, the Catholic Church had endorsed her projects, citing Biblical exhortations towards charity for the poor and Evita’s own personal priest, Father Benítez, claimed that the need to help the poor had taken over Eva Perón’s life. Finally, Congress assisted in 1950 by ruling that a proportion of all lottery tickets, cinema tickets and gambling games played in casinos should be given to the Foundation. By the time of Evita's death in 1952, the popularity of the Foundation amongst her millions of followers had given her an aura of sainthood.

Criticisms  

There were allegations that most of the Foundation's wealth was ill-gotten, with Evita coercing people into donating. There were examples of pressure, particularly with the infamous case of the Mu-Mu sweet manufacturers, who were temporarily shut down after they refused to give the Foundation a free donation of sweets for underprivileged children. There was, however, only one example of Evita targeting the landed aristocracy and this was when the Foundation received most of the 97 million pesos which the Bemberg dynasty were forced to pay after they had attempted to evade tax after their patriarch died abroad.

There were allegations that Evita set up a secret bank account in Switzerland with the funds, but these allegations have been dismissed by her more recent biographers.

Decline 

After Evita's premature death in 1952, the Foundation briefly passed under the control of other Peronist women; but it did not outlast the fall of the regime itself in 1955 and had been in terminal decline since 1952 anyway. It was disbanded like every other Perónist organization by the military junta in 1955, after they overthrew Juan Perón on September 19, 1955. As late as the 1970s, storage facilities full of goods intended for the Argentine poor were still being discovered.

Footnotes

External links 

Foundations based in Argentina
Children's charities based in Argentina
Social welfare charities
Eva Perón
History of Argentina (1943–1955)
1948 establishments in Argentina
1955 disestablishments in Argentina